No Good Woman is the fourth studio album by British glam rock band Geordie. It includes tracks that were recorded by the previous line-ups, as well as several new players. It is the band's last album with original lead vocalist Brian Johnson before he left to join AC/DC in 1980.

Track listing
"No Good Woman" (Dave Ditchburn, Vic Malcolm) - 4:00
"Wonder Song" (Ditchburn, Malcolm) - 5:04
"Going to the City" (Derek Rootham, Brian Johnson, Dave Robson) - 3:27
"Rock 'n' Roll Fever" (Roberto Danova, Steve Voice, Peter Yellowstone) - 3:02
"Ain't It a Shame" (Ditchburn, Malcolm) - 3:47
"Give It All You Got" (Malcolm) - 4:47
"Show Business" (Malcolm) - 2:59
"You've Got It" (Malcolm) - 5:36
"Sweet Little Rock 'n' Roller" (Danova, Howdar*, Yellowstone) - 3:00
"Victoria" (Malcolm) - 3:28

* "Howdar" is a pseudonym for the songwriting partnership of David Howman and Gavin Dare.

Personnel
Brian Johnson - vocals (3, 4, 9, 11, 12)
Dave Ditchburn - vocals
Vic Malcolm - guitar, vocals
Tom Hill - bass guitar
Brian Gibson - drums
Frank Gibbon - bass guitar
Derek Rootham - guitar
Dave Robson - bass guitar
Davy Whittaker - drums
George Defty - drums
Alan Clark - keyboards

References

1978 albums
Geordie (band) albums